HNLMS Orion was a steamship of the Dienst der bebakening en kustverlichting. The ship was build in the Dutch East Indies and served as inspection vessel (Dutch: inspectievaartuig). Later the ship was rebuild and transferred to the Government Navy, which used it as a hydrographic survey vessel.

Design and construction
Orion was ordered in 1911 at the Marine Etablissement te Soerabaja in the Dutch East Indies. The ship was launched on 9 March 1912 and commissioned into the Dienst der bebakening en kustverlichting on 1 August 1912. The Dutch engineer R.G. Leegstra was responsible for the design of Orion. The cost of building Orion was estimated at 271.700 Dutch guilders. 

Orion was frequently repaired throughout its career because of various defects.

Service history
In 1916 Orion was used to experiment with a different type of coal by testing if it could be used to power steam boilers.

Government Navy
On 1 October 1920 Orion was taken out of service of the Dienst der bebakening en kustverlichting  and rebuild at the Marine Etablissement te Soerabaja. After being rebuild the ship was transferred to the Government Navy and stationed in 1921 at Tandjong Priok.

In 1924 two ship's boats of the Orion collapsed near Koeaia Peudada.

In 1926 Orion was extensively repaired at the Droogdok Maatschappij Tandjong Priok.

In December 1929 Orion searched in the Java Sea for a reef that had been spotted a month earlier by a captain of the KPM. During the search the ship was joined by two Dornier Do J Wal flying boats.

In 1934 the commander of the Orion, Ph.A.C.Th. Knijff, was awarded the De Ruyter Medal for his service. Under his command a better waterway had been found near Samarinda and he successfully used a new method to do hydrographic research.

Second World War
At the start of the Second World War Orion had already been decommissioned and was used as a light ship at Balikpapan.

On 22 January 1942 Orion was sunk by the Dutch submarine K XVIII in the Bay of Balikpapan to make access to Balikpapan more difficult for the invading Japanese.

Notes

Citations

References

Survey vessels of the Government Navy
Ships built in the Dutch East Indies